Infernal is the sixth full-length studio album by the Swedish death metal band Edge of Sanity, released by Black Mark Production on February 5, 1997.

Dan Swanö left the band after recording for the album was completed due to artistic differences between himself and Andreas Axelsson. Swanö would later return and continue using the Edge of Sanity name after the other members had disbanded following the release of Cryptic.

Swanö's other band Nightingale recorded a cover version of the song "Losing Myself" for their album Nightfall Overture.

Track listing

Credits
Edge of Sanity
 Dan Swanö − lead vocals (on tracks 1, 3, 5–11), electric guitar, bass guitar, E-Bow (on tracks 1, 3, 6, 7 & 11), piano (on track 11)
 Andreas Axelsson − lead vocals (on tracks 2 & 4), electric guitar (on tracks 2, 4, 5, 8–10)
 Anders Lindberg − bass guitar (on tracks 2, 4, 5, 8–10)
 Benny Larsson − drums, percussion

Guests
 Peter Tägtgren − lead guitar (on track 4)	
 Anders Mareby − cello (on track 11)

Edge of Sanity albums
1997 albums
Albums produced by Peter Tägtgren